Milwaukee Pro Soccer is an upcoming American professional soccer club located in Milwaukee, Wisconsin. The club is planned to debut in the USL Championship in 2025.

History
On October 19, 2022, it was announced that a USL Championship franchise had been awarded to Milwaukee-based investors Kacmarcik Enterprises and Milwaukee Pro Soccer. At that time it was also announced that the club would begin play in the 2025 season at a newly-constructed 8,000-seat soccer-specific stadium in the upcoming Iron District MKE area. The franchise is set to become the city's first professional, outdoor soccer team since the Milwaukee Rampage folded in 2002.

A "Name the Team Campaign" created by ownership to hear fan suggestions for team names and branding is currently ongoing.

References

External links
 

Soccer clubs in Wisconsin
Sports in Milwaukee
USL Championship teams